Forlorn Hope may refer to:

Forlorn hope, a group of soldiers tasked with leading the vanguard in a military advance, where the risk of casualties is extremely high
Forlorn Hope, a group of pioneers that set out from Truckee, California to seek help for the Donner Party
Forlorn Hope (boat), the 1865 voyage of an open boat along the Western Australian coast
Hopeton, California, an unincorporated community in Merced County, California, formerly known by the names Forlorn Hope and Hopetown
 A song by After Forever on the album "Decipher"